Mandawara is located in Sapotra Tahsil of Karauli District in the State of Rajasthan in India. It comes under Sapotra Community Development Block. The nearest town is Karauli, which is about 19 kilometers away from Mandawara.

Population 
Mandawara is a village with a population of 3575, according to the Population Census of 2011. Out of the total population, 1929 are males while 1646 are females.

Sex ratio 
In Mandawara village, the population of children aged 0-6 is 508, which makes up 14.21% of the total population of the village, according to the Population Census of 2011. The average sex ratio in the village is 853, which is lower than the Rajasthan state average of 928. Additionally, the child sex ratio for Mandawara is 764, which is also lower than the Rajasthan average of 888.

References 

Cities and towns in Karauli district